Chao Chih-chien (born 13 September 1983) is a track and field athlete from Chinese Taipei who competes in the long jump at international level. He has a personal best of 7.95 metres.

He won the silver medal at the 2007 World Student Games. He represented his country at the 2006 Asian Games and the 2009 Asian Athletics Championships.

References

Living people
1983 births
Taiwanese male long jumpers
Asian Games competitors for Chinese Taipei
Athletes (track and field) at the 2006 Asian Games
Universiade medalists in athletics (track and field)
Universiade silver medalists for Chinese Taipei
Medalists at the 2007 Summer Universiade